Sutwik Island is a 14-mile-long (22.5 km) island in the U.S. state of Alaska, located at  off the Alaska Peninsula, east of Chignik Bay. It is part of Lake and Peninsula Borough and the Alaska Peninsula unit of the Alaska Maritime National Wildlife Refuge.

Islands of Alaska
Alaska Maritime National Wildlife Refuge
Protected areas of Lake and Peninsula Borough, Alaska